Babak Zanjani (born 12 March 1974) is an Iranian billionaire and business magnate. He was the managing director of the UAE-based Sorinet Group, one of Iran's largest business conglomerates.  In late 2013, he was arrested and accused of withholding $2.7 billion of government money owned by the Ministry of Petroleum, in his attempts to facilitate Iran's oil revenue hindered by the sanctions against Iran. He was convicted of corruption, sentenced to death, and is currently awaiting execution.

Several commentators have stated that Zanjani is perhaps a "fall guy" for corruption scandals in Iran.

Sorinet Group

Sorinet Group is an Iranian business conglomerate. The company is one of Iran's largest business conglomerates. Sorinet businesses include cosmetics, finance and banking, hospitality, commercial aviation, infrastructure, building material, information technology and international real estate development. It operates in countries including Iran, United Arab Emirates, Turkey, Tajikistan, Malaysia, China. He also owned Qeshm Airlines and Rah Ahan Sorinet F.C. in Iran.

In 2013, Zanjani stated that his net worth was $13.5 billion.

EU sanctions against Iran
Zanjani was named in the restrictive measures against Iran in December 2012 by the EU council on the grounds of "assisting designated entities to violate the provisions of the EU regulation on Iran and is providing financial support to the government of Iran". 
Zanjani was claimed to be "a key facilitator for Iranian oil deals and transferring oil-related money". He denied the accusation, declining any ties with the Iranian government and calling the Europeans' decision "a mistake".

The EU sanctions against Iran describe Zanjani as "a key facilitator for Iranian oil deals" and transferring oil related money and accused the Malaysia-based First Islamic Bank of being used to channel Iranian oil-related payments. Zanjani said the complex nature of his companies' transactions, involving large sums, might have misled EU authorities. Zanjani's companies were involved in the Labuan—Iran oil smuggling on the eastern coast of Malaysia. Labuan had been serving as a drop-off spot for Iranian crude.

Alleged dual nationality
In January 2013, an Iranian news website, Baztab, reported that Zanjani holds a Danish passport in addition to his Iranian one, a claim which was later denied by Zanjani. He called the passport's copy "fake", saying in an interview with the news website of Rahahan F.C., his football team: "This story [the copy of my passport] is too badly fabricated that they even put my picture on the passport without a tie. However, it is obligatory to tie a necktie to take pictures for European passports," which is not true.

Arrest and conviction
On 30 December 2013, Zanjani was arrested by Iranian police for his alleged role in the "gold for gas" sale of Iranian oil that avoided international sanctions in schemes Turkey and Malaysia. He was accused of embezzling more than €2.7 billion,  involving, among others, the National Bank of Tajikistan. Some days later, a spokesman from the National Bank of Tajikistan denied any cooperation between Zanjani and the bank and claimed all documents presented by Zanjani about their two-way communications were fake. He was tried in an Islamic Revolutionary Court. On 6 March 2016, he was convicted and sentenced to death for embezzlement and "spreading corruption on earth". In December 2016, the Supreme Court of Iran confirmed the sentence. 

However, his sentence has been stayed pending his return of the embezzled money, after which he may receive a pardon. 
Iran's Supreme Court indicated that his sentence will be commuted when his debts to the Iranian government are paid.

See also
 Reza Zarrab

References

External links

1974 births
Iranian businesspeople
Iranian billionaires
Iranian football chairmen and investors
Iranian white-collar criminals
Iranian prisoners sentenced to death
Living people
People from Tehran
Iranian expatriates in the United Arab Emirates
Prisoners sentenced to death by Iran
People convicted of corruption